The Douro class destroyers consisted of five ships used by the Portuguese Navy (Marinha Portuguesa) and two used by the Colombian Navy (Armada de la Repúbica de Colombia), all built during the 1930s.

Design and construction
In 1930, the Portuguese navy drew up a 10 year shipbuilding programme to replace its aging fleet, with planned purchases including two cruisers, twelve destroyers and a number of submarines and sloops. The competition for the design for destroyers was won by Yarrow Shipbuilders beating bids from Thornycroft and Italian shipyards. An order was placed for four ships on 12 June 1931, with two ships, Vouga and Lima to be built by Yarrows in the UK and the remaining ships, Tejo and Douro to be built at Lisbon with machinery to be supplied by Yarrow. A fifth ship, Dão, again to be built in Lisbon using Yarrow-supplied machinery, was ordered on 18 January 1933.

 

Armament was similar to contemporary Royal Navy destroyers, with a gun armament of four 4.7 in (120 mm) Vickers-Armstrong Mk G guns, and three 2-pounder Mk VIII "pom-pom" anti-aircraft guns. Two quadruple banks of 21-inch (533 mm) torpedo tubes were carried, while two depth charge throwers and 12 depth charges constituted the ships' anti-submarine armament. Up to 20 mines could be carried. The ships complement was 147 officers and men.

The two Yarrow-built ships were laid down in October 1931, and commissioned in 1933, while the first two Lisbon-built ships, Tejo and  Douro, laid down in 1932, were sold to the Colombian Navy before completion in response to the Leticia Incident between Columbia and Peru, and Peru's purchasing of two ex-Russian destroyers ( and Villar) from Estonia. Two further ships were ordered by the Portuguese Navy to replace them.

Service

The five destroyers carried out patrols to defend Portugal's neutrality during the Second World War. Their anti-aircraft armament was revised during 1942–43, with the three pom-poms and one of the banks of torpedo tubes replaced by six 20 mm cannon. They were refitted by Yarrow from 1946–49, with the machinery refurbished, anti-aircraft armament again revised to three Bofors 40 mm gun in powered mounts and three 20 mm cannon, and sonar and radar (British Type 285 and Type 291) fitted.

Four of the five destroyers were refitted and modernised again in 1957, (Douro was not refitted, and was disposed of in 1959) with two 4.7 inch guns removed, allowing a Squid anti-submarine mortar to be fitted and the anti-aircraft armament to be increased to five 40 mm Bofors guns and three 20 mm cannon. The last of the class, Vouga, was discarded in 1967.

Ships in class

Notes

Citations

Sources

 
 
 

 

 
Military history of Portugal
Portugal–United Kingdom military relations